Muddebihal Assembly seat is one of 224 assembly constituencies in Karnataka State, in India. It is part of Bijapur (Lok Sabha constituency).

Assembly Members

Bombay State
 1951: Sidhanti Pranesh Gurubhatt, Indian National Congress

Mysore State
 1957: Sidhanti Pranesh Gurubhatt, Indian National Congress
 1962: Sivashankarappa Mallappa Guraddi, Indian National Congress
 1967: Sivashankarappa Mallappa Guraddi, Indian National Congress
 1972: S. M. Murigeppa, Indian National Congress

Karnataka State
 1978:	Deshmukh Jagadevarao Sanganabasappa, Janata Party
 1983:	Deshmukh Jagadevarao Sanganabasappa, Janata Party
 1985:	Deshmukh Jagadevarao Sanganabasappa, Janata Party
 1989:	Appaji Channabasavaraj Shankararao Nadagouda, Indian National Congress
 1994:	Vimalabai Jagadevarao Deshmukh, Janata Dal
 1999:	Appaji Channabasavaraj Shankararao Nadagouda, Indian National Congress
 2004:	Appaji Channabasavaraj Shankararao Nadagouda, Indian National Congress
 2008:	Appaji Channabasavaraj Shankararao Nadagouda, Indian National Congress
 2013:	Appaji Channabasavaraj Shankararao Nadagouda, Indian National Congress
 2018: A. S. Patil (Nadahalli), Bharatiya Janata Party

Also see
List of constituencies of the Karnataka Legislative Assembly

References

Assembly constituencies of Karnataka
Bijapur district, Karnataka